K. Surendran, better known by his stage name Indrans, is an Indian actor and former costume designer, who appears in Malayalam films. He started his film career as a costume designer and actor in 1981 and got a breakthrough in 1994 with the comedy movie CID Unnikrishnan B.A., B.Ed. Indrans was popular for his comedy roles in the 1990s and 2000s.

He found success in playing character roles in his later career and won the Kerala State Film Award – Special Mention for his performance in Apothecary in 2014. In 2018, Indrans won the Kerala State Film Award for Best Actor for his performance in Aalorukkam. His performance in Veyilmarangal made him win the Best Actor Award at the 2019 Singapore International Film Festival. As of November 2021, he has starred in over 550 films.

Early life
Indrans was born on 16 March 1956. He is third among the seven children of Palavila Kochuvelu and Gomathi at Kumarapuram, Thiruvananthapuram. He has four sisters and two brothers.

Indrans had to face financial problems at his house and joined his uncle to learn tailoring.  Later, he joined amateur arts clubs and began acting in dramas. He started his acting career in television serial Kaliveedu in Doordarshan. Along with his brother, K. Jayakumar, he opened a tailoring shop named Indran's Brothers Tailors in Kumarapuram, Thiruvananthapuram.

Acting career
Indrans made his debut in the 1981 film Choothattam both as a costume designer and as an actor. The producer, TMN Charley, offered him a chance to assist him in costume designing and he worked with designing costumes for several years, acting in various small roles. He got noticed for playing a small role of a marriage broker in the 1993 film Meleparambil Anveedu. Indrans got his breakthrough with his role in CID Unnikrishnan B.A., BEd (1994). This led to him being cast in various comedic roles in the films of the 1990s. Indrans’ lean figure and peculiar way of delivering his dialogue and mannerisms made him a popular comedian in Malayalam cinema during these period. Some of his memorable roles came with the movies such as Malappuram Haji Mahanaya Joji, Manathe Kottaram, Vadhu Doctoranu, Aadyathe Kanmani, Aniyan Bava Chetan Bava etc. He played the character "Uthaman" in the 1998 cult hit Punjabi House. Indrans' combination with Harishree Ashokan resulted in some of the successful films.

In the early 2000s he also started playing some minor character roles. Subsequently, his role of a thief in the 2004 film Kathavasheshan got him noticed as a character actor. In Rahasya Police (2009), Indrans was revealed to be the villain of the movie at the end. He played another villain role in Pottas Bomb (2013). Indrans won the Kerala State Film Award – Special Mention for his performance in the 2014 film Apothecary.

In 2016, Indrans got noticed for his portrayal of a serious role, in the film Munroe Thuruth, directed by Manu. After this movie, he played several serious character roles. He appeared in serious avatars in Kaadu Pookunna Neram (2016) and God Say (2017). Indrans played several notable roles in films such as Makkana, Lonam, Paathi and Buddhanum Chaplinum Chirikkunnu. In 2018, he won the Kerala State Film Award for Best Actor for his performance in the 2017 film Aalorukkam. In 2019, he was awarded Singapore South Asian International Film Best actor award for his performance in Veyilmarangal. Veyil Marangal also won the Outstanding Artistic Achievement at the Shanghai International film festival. Indrans played the lead role in the movie Mohabbathin Kunjabdulla (2019). His brief cameo as the serial killer Ripper Ravi in the crime thriller Anjaam Pathiraa (2020) was critically acclaimed.

In 2021, he played the lead role of Oliver Twist in Home. The movie was well acclaimed by the critics and audience especially praising Indrans' performance.

Personal life
Indrans married Santhakumari on 23 February 1985. They have a daughter Mahitha and a son Mahendran.

Awards

 2014 - Kerala State Film Award – Special Mention for the film Apothecary
 2016 - CPC Cine Awards – Special Honorary Award
 2018 - Kerala State Film Award for Best Actor for the film Aalorukkam
 2019 - Singapore South Asian International Film Festival Best actor award for Veyilmarangal
 2019 - Shanghai International Film Festival Award for Best Film
 N.N. Pillai Smaraka Puraskaram (N.N. Pillai Memorial Award)

Filmography

Actor

Malayalam

1980s

1990s

2000s

2010s

2020s

Tamil

Aadum Koothu (2005)
Nanban (2012) as Govindan

Costume designer

Aniyatha Valakal (1980)
Choothaattam (1981)
Oru Madapravinte Katha (1983)
Vanitha Police (1984)
Sammelanam (1985)
Principal Olivil (1985)
 Namukku Parkkan Munthiri Thoppukal (1986)
 Thoovanathumbikal (1987)
 Sarvakalasala (1987)
 Moonam Pakkam (1988)
Aazhikkoru Muthu  (1989)
 Season (1989)
 Innale (1989) 
 Rajavazhcha (1990)
 Cheriya Lokavum Valiya Manushyarum (1990)
  Maala Yogam (1990)
 Njan Gandharvan (1991)
 Kaazhchakkppuram (1992)
 Ayalathe Addeham (1992)
 Kavadiyattam  (1993)
 Bhagyavan (1993)
 Sphadikam (1995)
 Kalyana Uniikal (1997)

Singer

Kadhanayakan (1997)

Television serials

Kadalinakare (Asianet)
Devimahatmyam (Asianet)
Pattukalude paaru (Surya TV)
Sabarimala sridharmashashtha (Asianet)
Nirupama Fans (Flowers TV)
Satyam shivam sundaram (Amrita TV)
Kaliveedu (Doordarshan)
Kunjammayum Koottukarum (Doordarshan)
smarakasilakal(Doordarshan)

References

External links
 
 Indrans at MSI

Male actors from Thiruvananthapuram
Indian male comedians
Costume designers of Malayalam cinema
1956 births
Living people
Male actors in Malayalam cinema
Indian male film actors
Kerala State Film Award winners
Indian male fashion designers
20th-century Indian male actors
21st-century Indian male actors
Indian male playback singers
Malayalam playback singers
20th-century Indian designers
Indian male television actors
Male actors in Malayalam television